The New Story of the Stone (T: 新石頭記, S: 新石头记) is a novel composed by Chinese author Wu Jianren and published in 1905. The novel is framed as a sequel of the classic novel, Dream of the Red Chamber (紅樓夢), by Cao Xueqin (曹雪芹).

References
 Wu, Jianren. "新石頭記: New Story of the Stone" Inner Mongolia People's Publishing House, January 1, 2016. , 9787204129447.

External links

20th-century Chinese novels
Novels first published in serial form
Novels by Wu Jianren